Enrique Daniel Vera Torres, nicknamed Rambert (born 10 March 1979, in Asunción), is a retired Paraguayan football midfielder who last played for América de Quito.

Vera has been primarily based since LDU Quito since 2006, winning the 2007 Serie A, the 2008 Copa Libertadores (playing in both legs of the final, the 2009 Recopa Sudamericana, and the 2009 Copa Sudamericana (scoring one goal).

Club career

Early in his career, Vera played for several Paraguayan clubs such as Resistencia, Sol de América and Sportivo Iteño before moving to Ecuador where he played for teams like Aucas, Olmedo, and LDU Quito. At the end of 2007, he was named best foreign player and best overall player of the Ecuadorian league by the newspaper El Comercio.

During the 2008, Vera was important member of the LDU Quito squad that won the 2008 Copa Libertadores, the first international for the club and for any club in Ecuador. Vera was nominated in the ideal team of the cup when he was chosen as an ideal substitute in the midfield position, along with teammates Damián Manso and Joffre Guerrón.

Shortly after the Copa Libertadores win, he signed a 4-year contract to play for Mexico's Club América. Vera scored his first goal for the Mexican side in his 4th game with the team in the Apertura 2008 1–1 draw against Pachuca.

On 18 June 2009, Vera was loaned back to LDU Quito after a bad spell at América. In the short time back, he was a key player for the club as they won two more international titles: the 2009 Recopa Sudamericana and the 2009 Copa Sudamericana.

He was sold to Atlas by America before the 2010 World Cup, where he would play with Paraguay. After a rather uneventful stint at Atlas, he returned to Ecuador for his third stint at LDU Quito. He has publicly stated he would like to retire at the Quito-based club.

In 2011 during his game with Liga de Quito, Enrique Vera left with a broken leg that took him out for more than a year until he returned to the field. In 2012, he was getting back into shape to start his new season with Liga de Quito in the 2013 season.

In December 2015, it was reported that Enrique Vera had signed with LDU Quito for one more season.

International career
Vera was first called to the Paraguayan football team in 2007 by Gerardo Martino. He has since participated in the 2007 Copa América and in the 2010 FIFA World Cup qualifiers with the national team, which qualified for the 2010 FIFA World Cup in South Africa.
He scored in the first half of Paraguay's second group match against Slovakia.

International goals

|-
| 1. || 19 November 2008 || Sultan Qaboos Sports Complex, Muscat, Oman ||  || 0–1 || 0–1 || Friendly ||
|-
| 2. || 2 June 2010 || Stadion Schützenwiese, Winterthur, Switzerland ||  || 0–1 || 0–2 || Friendly ||
|-
| 3. || 20 June 2010 || Free State Stadium, Bloemfontein, South Africa ||  || 0–1 || 0–2 || 2010 FIFA World Cup ||
|-
| 4. || 10 August 2010 || Estadio Defensores del Chaco, Asunción, Paraguay ||  || 1–0 || 2–0 || Friendly ||
|}

Honors
LDU Quito
Serie A (1): 2007
Copa Libertadores (1): 2008
Recopa Sudamericana (1): 2009
Copa Sudamericana (1): 2009

References

External links
 Vera's FEF Player Card
 Enrique Vera's Statistics

 

1979 births
Living people
Paraguayan footballers
Paraguayan expatriate footballers
Paraguay international footballers
Sportivo Trinidense footballers
Resistencia S.C. footballers
Club Sol de América footballers
Independiente F.B.C. footballers
Sportivo Iteño footballers
S.D. Aucas footballers
C.D. Universidad Católica del Ecuador footballers
C.D. Olmedo footballers
L.D.U. Quito footballers
Club América footballers
Atlas F.C. footballers
Sportivo Luqueño players
Liga MX players
Paraguayan Primera División players
Expatriate footballers in Mexico
Expatriate footballers in Ecuador
2010 FIFA World Cup players
2011 Copa América players
Association football midfielders
Naturalized citizens of Ecuador